Lenora is a municipality and village in Prachatice District in the South Bohemian Region of the Czech Republic. It has about 700 inhabitants.

Administrative parts
Villages of Houžná, Kaplice, Vlčí Jámy and Zátoň are administrative parts of Lenora.

History
Lenora was founded in 1834 as one of the last glassworks in Bohemian Forest.

References

Villages in Prachatice District
Bohemian Forest